is a Japanese baseball catcher who won a silver medal in the 1996 Summer Olympics. He also played for the Osaka Kintetsu Buffaloes in the Pacific League from 1998 to 2000.

References

External links
 
 
 

1969 births
Living people
People from Kanagawa Prefecture
Keio University alumni
Olympic baseball players of Japan
Olympic silver medalists for Japan
Baseball players at the 1996 Summer Olympics
Olympic medalists in baseball
Kintetsu Buffaloes players
Osaka Kintetsu Buffaloes players
Japanese baseball coaches
Nippon Professional Baseball coaches
Asian Games medalists in baseball
Baseball players at the 1994 Asian Games
Asian Games gold medalists for Japan
Medalists at the 1994 Asian Games
Medalists at the 1996 Summer Olympics